Maya Tsoclis, born on 5 August 1963 in Paris, is an acclaimed Greek travel journalist and former Member of Parliament. Maya Tsoclis studied sociology in France and worked in the fashion business as a designer for a decade before getting interested in travel journalism and documentaries. The documentary series Taxidevontas stin Ellada (Travelling in Greece, 1999-2003) and its sequel Taxidevontas me tin Magia Tsokli (Travelling with Maya Tsoclis, 2004-2013) with more than 180 hours of programming on public television made her a household name in Greece. Her shows, filmed in more than 70 countries received multiple awards.

From 2005 to 2010 Maya was the editor in chief of Passport magazine, a monthly travel magazine published by Kathimerini publications.

She was elected member of parliament in the election of 2009 as a candidate with PASOK. She resigned in 2012, after voting the sixth austerity package. 

Maya is the creator of various travel magazines and websites, runs an open air theater and is the co-founder of NISSOS Beer, an internationally awarded craft beer made in the island of Tinos.

Maya is the daughter of Greek artist Costas Tsoclis.

Television series
Mia Mera (2014)
Taxidevontas me tin Magia Tsokli (2004-2013)
Taxidevontas stin Ellada (1999-2004)

References

External links

Greek MPs 2009–2012
PASOK politicians
Greek journalists
French journalists
Greek television presenters
French television presenters
Greek women journalists
French women journalists
Greek women television presenters
French women television presenters
1963 births
Journalists from Paris
Politicians from Paris
Living people